Park Jeong-jin (born 18 March 1976) is a South Korean handball player. He competed in the men's tournament at the 2000 Summer Olympics.

References

1976 births
Living people
South Korean male handball players
Olympic handball players of South Korea
Handball players at the 2000 Summer Olympics
Place of birth missing (living people)
Asian Games medalists in handball
Handball players at the 1998 Asian Games
Handball players at the 2002 Asian Games
Asian Games gold medalists for South Korea
Medalists at the 1998 Asian Games
Medalists at the 2002 Asian Games
20th-century South Korean people
21st-century South Korean people